The Shire of Lowan was a local government area in the Wimmera region of western Victoria, Australia.

History

Lowan was originally part of the Shire of Wimmera, which was incorporated in 1862. On 31 December 1875, Lowan became a shire in its own right. Several parts of the shire split away in its first 20 years;

 the Shire of Dimboola severed from Lowan and incorporated on 2 April 1885;
 the West Riding was severed to form the Shire of Lawloit (Kaniva) on 29 May 1891;
 the South Riding was severed to form the Shire of Kowree on 29 May 1894.

Like many western shires, it lost a remote section to its north, when the Shire of Walpeup was created on 1 November 1911.

On 20 January 1995, the Shire of Lowan was abolished, and along with the Shire of Dimboola, was merged into the newly created Shire of Hindmarsh.

Wards

The Shire of Lowan was divided into four ridings on 31 May 1901, each of which elected three councillors:
 East Riding
 West Riding
 South Riding
 Southwest Riding

Towns and localities

 Baker
 Balrootan North
 Boyeo
 Broughton
 Kinimakatka
 Netherby
 Nhill*
 Propodollah
 Tarraginnie
 Waggon Flat
 Winiam
 Yannac

* Council seat.

Population

* Estimates in 1958, 1983 and 1988 Victorian Year Books.

References

External links
 Victorian Places - Lowan Shire

Lowan
1875 establishments in Australia